Ravni Žabljak Stadium is a football stadium in Žabljak, Montenegro. Situated on Durmitor mountain, in the town with highest elevation on the Balkans, it is used for football matches. The stadium is home to OFK Durmitor.

History
The stadium was built at the time of OFK Durmitor foundation. The stadium has one stand, with a capacity of 1,000 seats. It is situated on a high mountain with extreme elevation. During the winter months, the pitch is under the snow. Local authorities have stated they're planning a renovation of the stadium.

Pitch and conditions
The pitch measures 110 x 65 meters. The stadium meets criteria only for Montenegrin Third League games, not for highest-rank competitions. Due to heavy snow during the winter months, many games are playing under the hard conditions.

See also
OFK Durmitor
Žabljak
Durmitor

References

External links
 Stadium information

Football venues in Montenegro
Football in Montenegro
Žabljak Municipality